The Men's 50 metre freestyle event at the 2002 Commonwealth Games was held on 3 and 4 August at the Manchester Aquatics Centre.

Records
Prior to this competition, the existing world record was as follows;

The following records were established during the competition:

Results

Heats
The 16 fastest swimmers in the heats qualified for the semifinals.

Semifinals
The eight fastest swimmers from the semifinals progressed to the final.

Semifinal 1

Semifinal 2

Final
The final was held on 4 August at 17:30.

References

Men's 50 metre freestyle
Commonwealth Games